Kingswood School may refer to

in Burma

Kingswood High School, Kalaw 

in England

Kingswood House School, Epsom, Surrey
Kingswood School, Bath, Somerset
The Kingswood School, former name of Kingswood Secondary Academy, Northamptonshire
King's Wood School, Essex

in Canada

Kingswood Drive Public School, an elementary school in Brampton, Ontario
Kingswood Elementary School (British Columbia), an elementary school in Richmond
Kingswood Elementary School (Nova Scotia), an elementary school in Hammonds Plains

in the United States

Cranbrook Kingswood School, a private K-12 college preparatory school in Bloomfield Hills, Michigan
Kingswood-Oxford School, West Hartford, Connecticut

See also
Kingswood Academy (disambiguation)
Kingswood College (disambiguation)
Kingswood (disambiguation)